Polyipnus nuttingi, commonly known as Nutting's hatchet fish, is a species of ray-finned fish in the family Sternoptychidae.

References

Sternoptychidae
Fish of Hawaii
Fish described in 1905